The 1968–69 NBA season was the Warriors' 23rd season in the NBA and 7th in the San Francisco Bay Area.

Offseason

Roster

Regular season

Season standings

x – clinched playoff spot

Record vs. opponents

Game log

Playoffs

|- align="center" bgcolor="#ccffcc"
| 1
| March 26
| @ Los Angeles
| W 99–94
| Jeff Mullins (36)
| Nate Thurmond (27)
| Al Attles (9)
| The Forum10,697
| 1–0
|- align="center" bgcolor="#ccffcc"
| 2
| March 28
| @ Los Angeles
| W 107–101
| Rudy LaRusso (29)
| Nate Thurmond (28)
| Jim King (7)
| The Forum15,119
| 2–0
|- align="center" bgcolor="#ffcccc"
| 3
| March 31
| Los Angeles
| L 98–115
| Nate Thurmond (22)
| Nate Thurmond (20)
| Nate Thurmond (5)
| Oakland–Alameda County Coliseum Arena13,221
| 2–1
|- align="center" bgcolor="#ffcccc"
| 4
| April 2
| Los Angeles
| L 88–103
| Ron Williams (16)
| Nate Thurmond (15)
| Nate Thurmond (4)
| Cow Palace14,812
| 2–2
|- align="center" bgcolor="#ffcccc"
| 5
| April 4
| @ Los Angeles
| L 98–103
| Joe Ellis (23)
| Bill Turner (14)
| Nate Thurmond (6)
| The Forum17,309
| 2–3
|- align="center" bgcolor="#ffcccc"
| 6
| April 5
| Los Angeles
| L 78–118
| Jeff Mullins (21)
| Nate Thurmond (14)
| Jeff Mullins (5)
| Cow Palace8,924
| 2–4
|-

Awards and records
 Nate Thurmond, NBA All-Defensive First Team
 Rudy LaRusso, NBA All-Defensive Second Team

References

San Francisco
Golden State Warriors seasons
San Fran
San Fran